Mahindra College may refer to:

 Mahindra United World College of India, an international school near Pune, Maharashtra
 The Government Mohindra College, Patiala, India, sometimes referred to as Mahindra College

See also
 Mahindra (disambiguation)